Cumulus castellanus (from Latin castellanus, castle) is an unofficial name of a species of cumulus cloud that is distinctive because it displays multiple towers arising from its top, indicating significant vertical air movement. It is a misnomer for cumulus congestus and correspondingly can be an indicator of forthcoming showers and thunderstorms.  The World Meteorological Organization and the American Meteorological Society do not recognize cumulus castellanus as a distinct species, but instead classify all towering cumulus clouds as Cumulus congestus.

References 

Cumulus